The Republican Guard Band is a military band unit of the French Republican Guard, which is part of the National Gendarmerie. The band is composed of 120 professional musicians from national conservatories. As the senior band and field music unit of the French Armed Forces, it is aimed towards active participation as the musical accompaniment in all national events.

History 

The band was founded in 1848 by Jean-Georges Paulus. Its official debut dates back to 1852, when a concert was organized in honor of Jean Paulus, its founder and the first leader of the band.

The band made its first international performance in 1871, when it traveled to the United States. Since then, the musicians of the band have made numerous tours all over the world.

In 1993, the band was given its current name and was transferred to the Republican Guard. Since March 1, 1997, the band has been under the command of Colonel François Boulanger, with Lieutenant-Colonel Sébastien Billiard as his deputy.

Composition 

 Infantry Band of the Republican Guard 
 Fanfare band Section
 Fanfare Band 1
 Fanfare Band 2
 Mounted Fanfare Band
 Concert Band (80 musicians) 
 String Orchestra (40 musicians), likely to be presented in configurations of 24 or 12 bows, or in string quartets
 Symphony Orchestra
 String Quartet
 Napoleonic Drumline 
 Hunting Horn Platoon

Activities 
The concert band and string orchestra perform either separately or as a combined ensemble during state dinners, festivals, or government organized concerts with the French Army Choir, sometimes the role is played upon the symphony orchestra and the Fanfare Bands. The Infantry Band and Fanfare Bands also perform during the annual Bastille Day military parade in Paris.

As a general rule the bandsmen wear the blue uniform of the Republican Guard in all functions. In full dress the Infantry Band wears a shako, the mounted band wears a dragoon helmet.

Notable members and collaborators 
Raymond Guiot
Roger Boutry
Henri Couillaud
Bernard Galais
Romain Leleu
Jean-Georges Paulus
Pierre Thibaud

Unit music

Marches 

 Defile de la Garde Républicaine
Le Régiment de Sambre et Meuse
Marche Lorraine
Colonel Dupuy March
Musique de la Garde républicaine de Paris

Songs 
La Marseillaise
Chant du départ
La nuit américaine
La Madelon
Marche de la Garde Consulaire and La Victoire est à Nous

Bugle Calls 

 Aux Champs

See also 
 French Foreign Legion Music Band (MLE)
 Republican Guard (France)
 Military band
 National Gendarmerie

References

External links 

 
 
 
 
 
 
 
 

Marching bands
French military bands
Military units and formations established in 1848
1848 establishments in France
Mounted bands
Musical groups established in 1848
French Gendarmerie